RPH may refer to:

Registered Pharmacist (RPh), in the US
Radio Print Handicapped Network, or RPH Australia
Royal Perth Hospital, in Australia
Royal Preston Hospital, in England